Afternoon Ragas is a 1992 studio album by Nikhil Banerjee and includes performances of the ragas Bhimpalasi (or Bhimpalasri) and Multani.

Track listing 
 "Bhimpalasri Alap" – 10:40  
 "Bhimpalasri Slow Rupak Tal" – 15:30
 "Bhimpalasri Fast Tintal" – 6:38 
 "Bhimpalasri Jhala" – 2:51 
 "Multani Alap" – 10:39 
 "Multani Medium Tintal" – 17:40
 "Multani Fast Tintal" – 4:25 
 "Multani Jhala" – 9:02

References 

1971 albums
Nikhil Banerjee albums